Sar-e Sal (also known as Sar-e Sīl-e Zavāl) is a village in Rostam-e Yek Rural District, in the Central District of Rostam County, Fars Province, Iran. At the 2006 census, its population was 34, in 4 families.

References 

Populated places in Rostam County